Tomás Mourato Vermelho Mega Appleton (born 29 July 1993) is a Portuguese rugby union player. He plays as a wing and as a centre. He is studying to be a physician dentist.

He has played for CDUL since he was 6 years old, and was promoted to the first team in 2011/12. He won the Campeonato Português de Rugby with them in 2011/12, 2013/14 and 2016/17. He spent a season in England at Darlington Mowden Park, in National League One in 2015/16, returning to CDUL afterwards.

He has won 48 caps for Portugal, scoring 10 tries, 50 points on aggregate. He won his first cap at the 29–20 victory over Namibia, on 22 November 2014, in Lisbon. He has been a regular player for the "Lobos" ever since then. He played in the 2019 Rugby World Cup qualification tournament. He is currently the captain of the national team.

References

1993 births
Living people
Portuguese rugby union players
Portugal international rugby union players
Rugby union wings
Rugby union centres
Lusitanos XV players